René Bianco (21 June 1908 – 23 January 2008) was a French operatic baritone who performed at the Opéra Comique and the Paris Opera in a wide variety of leading roles.

References

1908 births
2008 deaths
French operatic baritones
People from Constantine, Algeria
20th-century French male opera singers